The 2019 Columbus Challenger II was a professional tennis tournament played on hard courts. It was the seventh edition of the tournament which was part of the 2019 ATP Challenger Tour. It took place in Columbus, United States between 10 and 16 June 2019.

Singles main draw entrants

Seeds

 1 Rankings are as of May 27, 2019.

Other entrants
The following players received entry into the singles main draw as wildcards:
  Justin Boulais
  Cannon Kingsley
  John McNally
  Nicolás Mejía
  James Trotter

The following players received entry into the singles main draw using protected rankings:
  Carlos Gómez-Herrera
  Daniel Nguyen
  Raymond Sarmiento

The following player received entry into the singles main draw as an alternate:
  Harri Heliövaara

The following players received entry into the singles main draw using their ITF World Tennis Ranking:
  Nicolás Álvarez
  Geoffrey Blancaneaux
  Gijs Brouwer
  Francisco Cerúndolo
  Orlando Luz

The following players received entry from the qualifying draw:
  Alejandro González
  Dennis Novikov

The following player received entry as a lucky loser:
  Aleksandar Kovacevic

Champions

Singles

 Mikael Torpegaard def.  Nam Ji-sung 6–1, 7–5.

Doubles

 Roberto Maytín /  Jackson Withrow def.  Hans Hach Verdugo /  Donald Young 6–7(4–7), 7–6(7–2), [10–5].

References

External links
 Official website

Columbus Challenger II
2019 in American tennis
June 2019 sports events in the United States